Vile Parle (station code: VLP) is a railway station on the Western line and Harbour line of the Mumbai Suburban Railway network. It serves the Vile Parle locality.

In July 2013, Ville Parle became the first station on the Western line, and second on the Mumbai Suburban Railway (after Thane railway station), to have an escalator. It cost .

Vile Parle railway station has 6 platforms (2 – Harbour Line, 2 – Main Line, 2 – Fast train platforms although fast trains don't stop here). In addition, it has a parallel line that is generally used for trains bound to and from Bandra Terminus.

Gallery

References

Railway stations in Mumbai Suburban district
2008 Mumbai attacks
Mumbai Suburban Railway stations
Mumbai WR railway division